The 1899–1900 Scottish Cup was the 27th season of Scotland's most prestigious football knockout competition. The Cup was won by holders Celtic when they beat Queen's Park in the final at the newly built Ibrox Park by a 4–3 scoreline to claim the trophy for a third time overall; it is the last major final to date for Queen's Park who were cup winners ten times in the 19th century.

Calendar

First round

First round replay

Second round

Second round replay

Quarter-final

Semi-finals

Semi-final replay

Final

Teams

See also
1899–1900 in Scottish football

References

RSSF Scottish Cup 99-00

Scottish Cup seasons
Cup
1899–1900 domestic association football cups